Matthew Brodie Groh (born 1981) is an American football executive who is the director of player personnel for the New England Patriots of the National Football League (NFL). Groh began his NFL career as a scouting assistant with the Patriots before working as a scout and executive since 2011.

Early years
Groh played college football at Princeton University as a quarterback. He graduated from Princeton in 2003 and would later earn a Juris Doctor degree from the University of Virginia in 2008.

Executive career

New England Patriots
In 2011, Groh began his NFL career with the New England Patriots as a scouting assistant. In 2013, he was promoted to area scout. In 2019, Groh was promoted to national and to director of college scouting in 2021. On February 15, 2022, Groh was promoted to director of player personnel, replacing Dave Ziegler following his departure to become the general manager of the Las Vegas Raiders.

Personal life
Groh is the son of former American football coach Al Groh and his brother, Mike, is the wide receivers coach for the New York Giants.

References

External links
 New England Patriots profile

1981 births
Living people
American football quarterbacks
Princeton Tigers football players
New England Patriots executives
New England Patriots scouts
People from Garden City, New York
People from Hingham, Massachusetts
University of Virginia alumni